This is a list of the members of the Dewan Negara (Senate) of the Sixth Parliament of Malaysia.

Elected by the State Legislative Assembly

Nominated by the Prime Minister and appointed by the Yang di-Pertuan Agong

Death in office
 Ismail Hassan (d. 4 October 1982)
 Mohamed Ghazali Jawi (d. 9 December 1982)
 Eban Salleh (d.  6 April 1983)
 Pandak Hamid Puteh Jali (d. 22 May 1983)
 Yaacob Engku Yunus (d. 26 August 1983)
 Hussein Mohd. Nordin (d. 8 April 1984)
 Salleh Kassim (d. 3 March 1985)

Footnotes

References

Malaysian parliaments
Lists of members of the Dewan Negara